The 1924 William & Mary Indians football team represented the College of William & Mary as an independent during the 1924 college football season. Led by second-year head coach J. Wilder Tasker, the Indians compiled a record of 5–2–1.

Schedule

References

William and Mary
William & Mary Tribe football seasons
William